Ingo Harden (born 26 February 1928) is a German music critic and writer.

Life 
Born in Hamburg, Harden studied musicology with Heinrich Husmann and piano with Ilse Fromm-Michaels. From 1954 he worked first as an author and later as an editor for the then Nordwestdeutscher Rundfunk. From 1964 he was one of the jurors, later until 2000 managing secretary of the Preis der deutschen Schallplattenkritik. From 1977 to 1991 Harden was the German representative of the International Record Critics' Award. After decades of work as a record critic for trade journals and daily newspapers such as Frankfurter Allgemeine Zeitung and Die Welt, Harden is still active today as an author for radio and books.

Work 
 Claudio Arrau : e. Interpretenportr..
 Epochen der Musikgeschichte. Entwicklung und Formen der europäischen Musik. Gerstenberg Verlag, Hildesheim 2007. 
 Kurze Geschichte in 5 Kapiteln: Klassische Musik. Jacoby & Stuart, Berlin 2010. .
 (together with Gregor Willmes:) Pianistenprofile: 600 Interpreten. Bärenreiter, Kassel 2008. .

References

External links 
 

1928 births
Living people
Writers from Hamburg
German music critics
20th-century German writers
20th-century German journalists